Hyperandra diminuta is a moth of the subfamily Arctiinae first described by Paul Dognin in 1923. It is found in South America.

References

Phaegopterina